Dean Morgan (born 14 October 1981) is a Jamaican cricketer. He played in one Twenty20 match for the Jamaican cricket team, against Canada, in 2010.

See also
 List of Jamaican representative cricketers

References

External links
 

1981 births
Living people
Jamaican cricketers
Jamaica cricketers
People from Saint Catherine Parish